Eguy Rosario (born August 25, 1999) is a Dominican professional baseball infielder for the San Diego Padres of Major League Baseball (MLB).

Career
Rosario signed with the San Diego Padres as an international free agent in 2015. After the 2021 season he played in the Arizona Fall League. 

On November 19, 2021, the Padres selected Rosario's contract and added him to the 40-man roster. He was assigned to the Triple-A El Paso Chihuahuas to begin the 2022 season. With the team, he hit .288/.368/.508 with 22 home runs, 81 RBI, and 21 stolen bases in 124 games. On August 26, 2022, Rosario was recalled and promoted to the major leagues for the first time. He made his MLB debut that day, and went 1-for-5 with a walk in 7 major league games with San Diego.

On February 3, 2023, it was announced that Rosario had suffered a broken ankle while doing sprinting drills during winter ball. The injury necessitated surgery and came with a recovery timetable of multiple months.

See also
 List of Major League Baseball players from the Dominican Republic

References

External links

1999 births
Living people
Major League Baseball players from the Dominican Republic
Major League Baseball infielders
San Diego Padres players
Dominican Summer League Padres players
Arizona League Padres players
Fort Wayne TinCaps players
Lake Elsinore Storm players
San Antonio Missions players
Toros del Este players
Bravos de Margarita players
Peoria Javelinas players
El Paso Chihuahuas players